Juegos del destino (English title: Games of Destiny) is a Mexican telenovela produced by Patricia Lozano for Televisa in 1981. It is an original story by Marissa Garrido and Arturo Moya Grau and adapted by Valeria Phillips.

In first part of the telenovela Mónica Sánchez-Navarro and Otto Sirgo starred as protagonists, while Lucy Gallardo starred as main antagonist and second part of telenovela Rocío Banquells and Enrique Novi starred as protagonists, while Macaria starred as main antagonist.

Cast 
Lucy Gallardo as Doña Rosario de Morantes
Guillermo Murray as Don José Luis Morantes
Mónica Sánchez-Navarro as Vanessa
Otto Sirgo as José Luis Morantes Jr.
Rocío Banquells as Sofía
Enrique Novi as José Antonio
Macaria as Hilda
Guillermo Zarur as Don Guille
Pedro Damián as Javier
Rosángela Balbó as Leticia
Lupita Pallás as Josefina
Martha Ofelia Galindo as Carmen
Rosa María Moreno as Cristina
Alejandra Peniche as Laura
Alejandro Camacho as Álvaro
Yolanda Vidal as María
Lucía Guilmáin as Gabriela
Carlos Petrel as Dr. Quiroz
Ana Patricia Rojo as Vanessa (child)
Mario Sauret as Fidencio
Pamela Méndez as Antonieta
Edgardo Gazcón as José Antonio (child)
Karla Petrel as Sofía (child)
Raúl Meraz as Bernardo
Maricarmen Martinez as Catalina
Raquel Pankowsky as Teresa
Héctor Kiev as Marcos
José Alberto Rodríguez as Rodrigo
César Arias as Benito
Enrique Beraza as Armando

References

External links

Mexican telenovelas
1981 telenovelas
Televisa telenovelas
Spanish-language telenovelas
1981 Mexican television series debuts
1982 Mexican television series endings